Point Lookout may refer to:

Places
Point Lookout (Colorado), a mountain in Mesa Verde National Park
Point Lookout (New South Wales), a mountain in New South Wales
Point Lookout, Maryland
Point Lookout State Park, Maryland, site of an American Civil War prisoner of war camp
Point Lookout, Missouri
Point Lookout, New York
 Point Lookout, Virginia
Point Lookout, Pleasants County, West Virginia
Point Lookout, Queensland, the headland and village in Australia
Point Lookout Archaeological Site, Gloucester County, Virginia
Point Lookout Cemetery in the Louisiana State Penitentiary (also known as "Angola")
Point Lookout Sandstone

Lighthouses
Point Lookout Light, Australia
Point Lookout Light, Maryland, US

See also
 Point Lookout, Australia (disambiguation)
 Point (disambiguation)
 Lookout (disambiguation)